Umm al-Dawali is a village in northern Syria located northwest of Homs in the Homs Governorate. According to the Syria Central Bureau of Statistics, Umm al-Dawali had a population of 1,558 in the 2004 census. Its inhabitants are predominantly Alawites.

References

Bibliography

 

Populated places in Talkalakh District
Alawite communities in Syria